(29 April 1916 – 4 July 2006) was a Norwegian educator and school headmaster. He became associated with the Christian Democratic Party and was elected to the Norwegian Parliament. He served as the 27th prime minister of Norway from 1972 to 1973, leading the cabinet that took over when Trygve Bratteli resigned in the wake of the first referendum over Norway's membership in the European Economic Community.

Early life and career
Lars Korvald was born at  Nedre Eiker in Buskerud, Norway. His parents were Engebret Korvald (1873-1956) and Karen Sofie Wigen (1876-1965).
He attended  Hamar Cathedral School graduating in 1940. He attended the Norwegian College of Agriculture at Ås in Akershus where he  graduated in 1943.

Lars Korvald had been  educated in agricultural studies. Upon graduation, he  joined the faculty of the Tomb Agricultural School (Tomb Jordbruksskol). The school was situated by the Krokstadfjordenon at Råde  in Østfold. This was the site of a former estate (Tomb herregård i Råde) which had dated from the Middle Ages. In 1938, the estate was purchased by the Norwegian Lutheran Mission (Det norske lutherske Indremisjonsselskap) which established  a high school and a modern farm operation on the property. The school offered several education programs with the principal focus on agriculture and agronomy. Korvald became Rector at Tomb in 1952.

Parliamentary career
Korvald was first elected to the Parliament of Norway in 1961 representing the county of Østfold. In 1965, he was appointed parliamentary leader; and in 1967 the party leader. Altogether, Korvald served as a member of Parliament for five terms between 1961 and 1981. He was President of the Lagting 1969–1972.

Prime Minister

Lars Korvald served as Prime Minister from 18 October 1972 to 16 October 1973. Though short-lived, his cabinet served as an important milestone in Norwegian politics, both because it marked the conclusion of the bitter and divisive debate over Norway's membership in the European Economic Community (EEC) and because it was a centrist non-socialist coalition. He was also the first prime minister from the Christian Democratic Party.

Korvald proved to be an effective prime minister in a very difficult and transitional political situation. His cabinet commissioned the negotiations for a trade treaty with the EEC and instituted Norway's first petroleum policy. In addition, the Teachers' Training Law of June 1973 was a move to raise teacher training to university status.

Korvald didn’t seek re-election in 1981 to the Storting after 20 years of service. That same autumn he was appointed County Governor in Østfold. He held in this position until he retired at the age  of 70 in 1986.

Personal life
In 1943, he married  Ruth Aarny Borgersen (1915–2006). While serving as Prime Minister, Korvald resided in Bærum. He later resided in Moss,  but in his later life he moved back to Mjøndalen.

References

External links
Tomb Videregående skole og landbruksstudier website

1916 births
2006 deaths
People from Nedre Eiker
Østfold politicians
Norwegian College of Agriculture alumni
Norwegian educators
Norwegian Lutherans
Christian Democratic Party (Norway) politicians
Members of the Storting
County governors of Norway
20th-century Norwegian politicians
Prime Ministers of Norway
20th-century Lutherans